South Korea competed at the 1997 East Asian Games held in Busan, South Korea from May 10, 1997, to May 19, 1997. South Korea finished third with 45 gold medals, 38 silver medals, and 51 bronze medals.

Medal summary

References

East Asian Games
1997 East Asian Games
South Korea at the East Asian Games